Ravia is a town in Johnston County, Oklahoma, United States. The population was 528 at the 2010 census, up from 459 in 2000.

Geography
Ravia is located in southwestern Johnston County at  (34.241756, -96.755592). Oklahoma State Highway 1 passes through the town, leading north  to Ada and southwest  to its terminus at U.S. 177. State Highway 22 runs east from Ravia  to Tishomingo, the Johnston county seat.

Demographics

As of the census of 2000, there were 459 people, 175 households, and 131 families residing in the town. There were 201 housing units at an average density of 357.8 per square mile (138.6/km2). The racial makeup of the town was 71.90% White, 17.43% Native American, 0.87% from other races, and 9.80% from two or more races. Hispanic or Latino of any race were 0.87% of the population.

There were 175 households, out of which 31.4% had children under the age of 18 living with them, 53.1% were married couples living together, 14.3% had a female householder with no husband present, and 25.1% were non-families. 23.4% of all households were made up of individuals, and 16.0% had someone living alone who was 65 years of age or older. The average household size was 2.62 and the average family size was 3.09.

In the town, the population was spread out, with 24.4% under the age of 18, 11.8% from 18 to 24, 27.5% from 25 to 44, 20.3% from 45 to 64, and 16.1% who were 65 years of age or older. The median age was 37 years. For every 100 females, there were 93.7 males. For every 100 females age 18 and over, there were 85.6 males.

The median income for a household in the town was $20,694, and the median income for a family was $26,094. Males had a median income of $20,962 versus $15,729 for females. The per capita income for the town was $13,391. About 26.5% of families and 30.0% of the population were below the poverty line, including 43.5% of those under age 18 and 26.2% of those age 65 or over.

Notable person
While not born in the town, country singer and actor Gene Autry was raised partially in Ravia.

References

Towns in Johnston County, Oklahoma
Towns in Oklahoma